The United States Air Force's 3d Space Communications Squadron (3 SCS) was a space communications squadron located at Kapaun AS, Germany.

Mission

History

Previous Designations
3d Space Communications Squadron (1 May 1992 – 1 August 2002)
3d Communications Squadron (1 August 1986 – 1 May 1992)
Detachment 6, 1st Space Wing (1 May 1983 – 1 August 1986)

Assignments

Major Command
Air Force Space Command (1 August 1986 – 1 August 2002)

Numbered Air Force
14th Air Force (1 July 1993 – 1 August 2002)

Wing/Group
21st Space Wing (15 May 1992 – 1 August 2002)
1st Space Wing (1 August 1986 – 15 May 1992)

Location
Kapaun AS, Germany (1 May 1983 – 1 August 2002)

Commanders
Lt Col Susan A. Goodrich (c. August 1994)

Decorations
Air Force Outstanding Unit Award 
1 May 1983 – 30 April 1984 (as Det 6, 1st Space Wing)

References

External links
Globalsecurity.org: 3d Space Communications Squadron

Space squadrons of the United States Air Force
Communications squadrons of the United States Air Force